Polina Alexandrovna Korobeynikova (born 12 April 1996) is a Russian former figure skater. She is the 2012 Cup of Nice champion and the 2011–12 Junior Grand Prix Final bronze medalist. She placed 4th at the 2012 European Championships.

Career 
Korobeynikova's parents enrolled her in figure skating when she was three-and-a-half in order to improve her health. She loved the activity from the start. She also took skiing lessons. As a young child, Korobeynikova was coached by Eteri Tutberidze but due to Moscow's traffic jams, Tutberidze encouraged her to switch to the Moskvich rink which is nearer to the skater's home. Korobeynikova has been coached by Viktoria Volchkova since mid-2007. She was in Volchkova's first group of students after her retirement from competition.

Korobeynikova was 10th on the senior level at the 2011 Russian Championships.

2011–2012 season 
Korobeynikova began competing internationally in the 2011–12 season after learning the triple flip-triple toe and the triple lutz. Her first Junior Grand Prix event was Brisbane, Australia, where she placed 4th. At her next event, in Brasov, Romania, she won a silver medal. Her placements qualified her for the Junior Grand Prix Final. At the Final, Korobeynikova placed 5th in the short program and 3rd in the free to win the bronze medal.

Korobeynikova was 7th at the 2012 Russian Championships. Since four skaters above her were age-ineligible, she was named in the Russian team to the European Championships. Initially, there were concerns that she would not receive her visa in time and would have to be replaced by Sofia Biryukova. Korobeynikova made her senior international debut at the 2012 European Championships. She qualified for the short program by winning the preliminary round with a free program containing seven triple jumps, including a triple flip-triple toe combination. Korobeynikova placed 12th in the short program but was ranked 2nd in the long program. She received the highest TES score in the ladies' free skating segment – six points higher than the next best, gold medalist Carolina Kostner – after completing another program with seven triple jumps, including the triple flip-triple toe combination. She was awarded a small silver medal for the free skating segment. Korobeynikova finished in 4th place overall, off the podium by 1.8 points. She placed the highest of the three Russian ladies at the event, finishing ahead of Ksenia Makarova and Alena Leonova. Korobeynikova finished 19th at the 2012 World Championships.

Later seasons 
Korobeynikova had a foot injury prior to the 2012–2013 season. She started her season at the 2012 Cup of Nice. Placing 11th in the short program and first in the free skate, she finished first overall and won her first senior international title. Korobeynikova placed 7th at her first Grand Prix assignment, the 2012 Rostelecom Cup. At her next event, the 2012 Trophée Eric Bompard, she was 5th in the short program and finished 6th overall. Korobeynikova said the season was difficult for her due to an injury and some growing which affected her balance. She finished 10th at the 2013 Russian Championships.

In the 2013–14 season, Korobeynikova withdrew from her sole Grand Prix assignment, the 2013 Cup of China, and was replaced by Nikol Gosviani. She completed her career in 2014.

Programs

Competitive highlights 
GP: Grand Prix; JGP: Junior Grand Prix

Detailed results 

(Small medals for short and free programs awarded only at ISU Championships.)

References

External links 

 
 Polina Korobeynikova at sport-folio.net
 Fanpage www.polinafan.de

1996 births
Living people
Russian female single skaters
Figure skaters from Moscow
21st-century Russian women